Warder may refer to:
 Prison officer

Places 
 Warder, Netherlands, a village in the municipality of Zeevang
 Warder, Germany, a municipality in Schleswig-Holstein
Warder, Ethiopia, a town in Somali Region of Ethiopia

People
A. K. Warder (Anthony Kennedy Warder, 1924–2013), scholar of Indology
Frederick B. Warder, recipient of two Navy Crosses during world War II 
Frederick L. Warder (1912–1980), New York politician
John Aston Warder  (1812–1883), physician, forester, and horticulturist
Laurie Warder (born 1962), former professional tennis player from Australia
Luther Warder (1841–1902), former mayor of Jeffersonville, Indiana
Marie Warder (born 1927), founder and former President of the Hemochromatosis Society of South Africa
Walter Warder (1851–1938), American politician and lawyer

As a given name
Warder Clyde Allee (1885–1955), American ecologist
Warder Cresson (1798–1860), U.S. Consul to Jerusalem

Other uses 
 Warder (Wheel of Time), from the novels by Robert Jordan
 Warder Mansion, Washington, D.C.
 Yeomen Warders, ceremonial guardians of the Tower of London

See also
Ward (disambiguation)
Werder (disambiguation)